The Sardinian People's Party (Partito del Popolo Sardo, PPS) was a political party in Sardinia.

The PPS was founded in 2000 by a split of Italian People's Party. In the Regional Council of Sardinia three councilors joined the party: Pietrino Fois, Silvestro Ladu and Pasquale Onida.

In 2004 the PPS joined the new party Fortza Paris.

References

Political parties in Sardinia
Catholic political parties
Christian democratic parties in Italy